Senator Titus may refer to:

Cliff Titus (1890–1988), Missouri State Senate
Dina Titus (born 1950), Nevada State Senate
Robert C. Titus (1839–1918), New York State Senate
William A. Titus (1868–1951), Wisconsin State Senate